Flores Island Marine Provincial Park, also known as Flores Island Provincial Park, is a provincial park in British Columbia, Canada, located on the island of the same name in the central Clayoquot Sound region of the West Coast of Vancouver Island, British Columbia, Canada.  The park contains 7113 ha. and was created on July 13, 1995, as part of the Clayoqout Land-Use Decision.  Gibson Marine Provincial Park, which was created in 1967, adjoins it to the southeast.  Sulphur Passage Provincial Park is off the northeast coast of Flores Island, surrounding Obstruction Island.

See also
Marktosis, British Columbia
Vargas Island Provincial Park

References

Clayoquot Sound region
Provincial parks of British Columbia
1995 establishments in British Columbia
Protected areas established in 1995
Marine parks of Canada